Deaf School is an English art rock/new wave band, formed in Liverpool, England, in January 1974.

Overview
Between 1976 and 1978, the year in which they split up, Deaf School recorded three albums for the Warner Brothers label. The first album's art rock style had roots in cabaret, and later releases moved towards a harder punk rock sound. Deaf School have been recognized as an important influence on many British musicians. According to Frankie Goes to Hollywood singer Holly Johnson: "They revived Liverpool music for a generation." The journalist, author and founder of Mojo, Paul Du Noyer, went further: "In the whole history of Liverpool music two bands matter most, one is The Beatles and the other is Deaf School."

Nearly all the group's members went on to enjoy successful careers, notably guitarist Clive Langer, who produced Madness and Dexys Midnight Runners, two non-Liverpool acts which cite Deaf School as an influence. Langer also co-wrote (with Elvis Costello) the song "Shipbuilding".

History
Formed by students and staff at Liverpool Art College, Deaf School were named after its rehearsal venue, a former school for the deaf that had become a college annexe. Their initial aim was to play the college's 1973 Christmas dance. The group's lead male vocalist, Enrico Cadillac Jnr recalls that "Anyone who wanted to be in it could be. There were about 13 on stage at that time. No one could play – it was based on people we thought were interesting . . we entered (and) . . won the Melody Maker rock and folk contest and were suddenly a big deal. We signed to Warners because their A&R guy, Derek Taylor, had been The Beatles publicist and when he saw us rehearsing in Mathew Street, he cried his eyes out".

The informal early line-up was gradually whittled down, though live shows were still chaotic and colourful, marked by their diversity of costumes and instrumentation, with strong elements of performance art. Deaf School's debut album, 2nd Honeymoon, was released in the UK in August 1976. Its reception at the time was muted by the sudden popularity of punk rock, a style whose anger and urgency seemed at odds with Deaf School's more whimsical and eclectic approach. The band itself appeared to address this problem on subsequent albums Don’t Stop The World (1977) and English Boys/Working Girls (1978), which were more aggressive and focused. Despite some lavish promotion by Warner Brothers and their continued popularity as a live act, Deaf School did not achieve significant chart success. In 1977, their first two albums were re-packaged together for the US market, and several American dates were played in support, but no commercial breakthrough was made. By mutual consent the band left Warner Brothers in 1978 and pursued separate careers.

On disbanding, several members continued working in the music industry. Singer Bette Bright led her own band The Illuminations (and married the lead singer of Madness, Suggs). Clive Langer became one of the foremost record producers of the 1980s and 1990s, working with Madness, Morrissey, David Bowie, Dexys Midnight Runners and Bush amongst others. Bassist Steve Lindsey formed The Planets, scoring a Top of the Pops appearance with his song "Lines". Enrico Cadillac Jnr (real name Steve Allen) joined Ian Broudie (former member of Big in Japan) to form the Original Mirrors who released two albums. Allen later formed The Perils of Plastic with former Attractions keyboard player Steve Nieve, before going onto a successful pan-European solo career, later taking on the management of Espiritu as well as an A&R post with Warner Bros. Records from 1993 to 2004. Ian Ritchie became a prolific composer, producer and session player. Eric Shark went on to work with Geoff Davies and set up Probe Plus, responsible for Half Man Half Biscuit amongst others.

In 1988, most former Deaf School members reunited for live dates, with one of their Liverpool performances released as a live album, 2nd Coming, produced by Langer and Julian Wheatley. Guests included Tin Machine's Reeves Gabrels, Nick Lowe and Lee Thompson from Madness.

Tim Whittaker died in 1996 but ten years later, in May 2006, the remaining members of Deaf School reformed for more concerts, culminating in an oversubscribed show in Liverpool for the reopening of the New Picket in the newly formed Independent District on 27 May. In September 2007 Deaf School reunited again and played several live shows including a warm up at The Dublin Castle pub in Camden Town followed by the Manchester Academy and the Carling Academy Liverpool. In December 2007 they played again at the Indigo2 venue at The O2 in London for Madness's aftershow party. Suggs said, "In Madness we’d all listened to Deaf School records. Their first album was a big phenomenon in our lives. In 1975 they played at the Roundhouse in Camden, which was the greatest music venue in the world as far as we were concerned, and I was bowled over by them..". In September 2009 the band did shows at The Dublin Castle and The Garage in London before returning to Liverpool for four sell-out concerts at The Everyman Theatre, and an appearance at The Hope Street Festival. The three Deaf School studio albums were re-mastered and released in September 2009 on Cherry Red's Lemon label.

The full band augmented by ex-Crackout drummer Nicholas Millard, played 'The Deaf School Xmas Bash' shows in December 2009 at the 100 Club in London, and the Liverpool O2 Academy, making it ten live appearances in 2009, a first since the 1970s.

Band member Thomas Sam Davis (aka Eric Shark) died, aged 59, on 7 January 2010, from lung disease. The band played two concerts in Liverpool in April in tribute, featuring guests such as Suggs, Ian Broudie and Kevin Rowland.

Deaf School announced nine live dates aka 'The Listen & Learn Tour' in early 2011 including The Garage London and dates in Sheffield, Manchester, Birmingham, Glasgow and Liverpool culminating in two shows in Tokyo. A mini album, entitled Enrico & Bette xx was released in 2011 containing five new songs, "You Turn Away", "I Know I Know", "The Enrico Song", "Goodbye To All That" and "Scary Girlfriend".

Deaf School again appeared at The Everyman Theatre Liverpool for two emotionally charged 'Goodbye to the Everyman' shows as part of the refurbishment closure events, and played the Port Eliot festival July 2011.

A history by Paul Du Noyer, Deaf School: the Non-Stop Pop Art Punk Rock Party, was published in the UK by the Liverpool University Press in October 2013, to mark the 40th anniversary of the band's formation.

In 2013, Gregg Braden joined the band as permanent drummer. Deaf School's latest album, LAUNDERETTE, was released in Japan on 27 May 2015 by Hyabusa Landings. The album features seven new studio tracks alongside five tracks recorded live at the Floral Pavilion New Brighton in November 2014, along with a bonus track from 1987 featuring Eric Shark on lead vocals. A full-length studio album of new material, entitled Let's Do This Again Next Week - their first for 39 years - was released in December 2017, featuring new songs written by the band in various formations. Although still a member of the band, tour commitments with Roger Waters (with whom he has collaborated for three decades) meant that Ian Ritchie was unable to contribute to the recordings. A short tour in support of the album, featuring the full seven-person lineup of the band, followed the same month.

In November 2022, Deaf School reformed to play London's 100 Club, followed by shows in Brighton & Liverpool, featuring all the living members of the original line up, with Gregg Braden on drums.

Band members
 Bette Bright (birth name Anne Martin) - vocals
 Enrico Cadillac Jnr (birth name Steve Allen) - vocals
 Eric Shark (birth name Thomas John Davis) - vocals (b.1950 – d.2010)
 Ian Ritchie - woodwind instruments
 Max Ripple (birth name John Wood) - keyboards
 Cliff Hanger (birth name Clive Langer) - guitar
 Steve "Average" Lindsey - bass guitar
 Tim Whittaker - drums (b. Timothy John Whittaker, 8 October 1952, Clitheroe, Lancashire –  d. 20 July 1996, Liverpool)
 Gregg Braden - drums 2013 – present

Discography

Albums
 1976: 2nd Honeymoon (AUS #63)
 1977: Don't Stop the World 
 1978: English Boys/Working Girls 
 2011: Enrico & Bette xx
 2015: Launderette
 2017: Let's Do This Again Next Week

Live album
 1988: 2nd Coming: Liverpool '88

Compilation albums
 2003: What a Way to End It All: The Anthology
 2021: Parigi My Dear

Singles
 1976: "What a Way to End It All"/"Nearly Moonlit Night Motel" (AUS #72)
 1977: "Taxi"/"Last Night"
 1978: "All Queued Up"/"Golden Showers"
 1978: "Thunder & Lightning" / "Working Girls'"
 2011: "The Survivor Song"
 2017: "Bed & Breakfast"/"Loving You"

References

External links
Official Deaf School Fansite
Official MySpace site
Discography
Clive Langer & THE CLANG GROUP
Eric's Productions | Deaf School Management
Julian Wheatley official website

English new wave musical groups
Musical groups from Liverpool
Protopunk groups
English art rock groups